Eremiya Hill (‘Eremiyski Halm’ \e-re-'miy-ski 'h&lm\) is an ice-covered hill rising to 863m in the west part of Marescot Ridge on Trinity Peninsula in Graham Land, Antarctica.  It is surmounting Malorad Glacier to the southwest.

The hill is named after the settlement of Eremiya in Western Bulgaria.

Location
German-British mapping in 1996.

Maps
 Trinity Peninsula. Scale 1:250000 topographic map No. 5697. Institut für Angewandte Geodäsie and British Antarctic Survey, 1996.
 Antarctic Digital Database (ADD). Scale 1:250000 topographic map of Antarctica. Scientific Committee on Antarctic Research (SCAR). Since 1993, regularly updated.

References
 Eremiya Hill. SCAR Composite Antarctic Gazetteer
 Bulgarian Antarctic Gazetteer. Antarctic Place-names Commission. (details in Bulgarian, basic data in English)

External links
 Eremiya Hill. Copernix satellite image

Hills of Trinity Peninsula
Bulgaria and the Antarctic